The 2011 Parramatta Eels season is the 65th in the club's history. Coached by Stephen Kearney and captained by Nathan Hindmarsh, they competed in the NRL's 2011 Telstra Premiership. The Eels finished the regular season in 14th place, failing to make the finals for the second consecutive year.

Summary
The Parramatta club made several new player signings for the 2011 season. In the forwards, the Eels added former Queensland centre Carl Webb and former Canterbury and Cronulla as well as one-time Kangaroo Reni Maitua.  To bolster the backs after the retirement of Eric Grothe Jr and the departure of Timana Tahu, the Eels signed the experienced pair of Chris Walker and Chris Hicks.

2011 can be considered to have been a year of "almost" for Parramatta, with the team losing over half of their matches by four points or less, many of which were conceded after attaining leads over their opponents. The Eels pushed a record four games into Golden Point during the season, however were unable to win any, resulting in a draw against the St George Illawarra Dragons and one-point losses to the Penrith Panthers, Sydney Roosters and the Canterbury-Bankstown Bulldogs.

Throughout the 2011 season, coach Stephen Kearney motioned several reshuffles of the Parramatta side, the most high-profile change being fullback Jarryd Hayne's switch to five-eighth after his ball-playing abilities were considered by several experts including the NSW State of Origin coach Ricky Stuart, as his strongest point. Other switches include the moving of Luke Burt to fullback, second-rower Ben Smith to right centre, and the resting of five-eighth Daniel Mortimer.

Before the final match of their season, Parramatta had won only five of their 24 games and were in contention for the dreaded wooden spoon. During their final match, the Parramatta side emerged victorious over the Gold Coast Titans who were also direct contenders for last place. The wooden spoon was awarded to the Gold Coast side, finishing 16th on the NRL ladder with Parramatta finishing in 14th position.

Standings

National Rugby League

National Youth Competition

Fixtures

Pre-season

Home and away season

Players and staff
The playing squad and coaching staff of the Parramatta Eels for the 2011 NRL season as of 29 May 2011.

Awards
The following awards were awarded in the post-season:
Michael Cronin clubman of the year award: Les 'Tex' Brooker
Ken Thornett Medal (Players' player): Fuifui Moimoi
Jack Gibson Award (Coach's award): Fuifui Moimoi
Eric Grothe Rookie of the Year Award: Mitchell Allgood

References 

Parramatta Eels seasons
Parramatta Eels season